Jörg Böhme (born 22 January 1974) is a German former footballer who played as midfielder, and who most recently was the manager of Energie Cottbus.

Club career
Böhme was born in Hohenmölsen, East Germany. As a professional footballer, Böhme played for FC Carl Zeiss Jena, 1. FC Nürnberg, Eintracht Frankfurt, 1860 München, Arminia Bielefeld, FC Schalke 04 and Borussia Mönchengladbach. On club level he won two German Cup trophies with FC Schalke 04.

Released by Mönchengladbach in May 2006, Böhme signed a 12-month deal mainly based on appearance money with old club Arminia Bielefeld before the start of the 2006–07 season. He remained with Bielefeld for two seasons, retiring in 2008.

International career
For the German national team Böhme was capped 10 times and scored 1 goal between 2001 and 2003. He participated in the 2002 FIFA World Cup, where Germany finished as runners-up. The main reasons why he was included resided in his good left foot abilities and his set pieces.

Coaching career
Böhme was head coach of Herford between 3 May 2012 and 5 June 2012. Bohme had only two wins while in charge of Herford. Böhme joined Energie Cottbus as an assistant coach on 22 January 2014. Böhme was promoted to head coach of Energie Cottbus after Stephan Schmidt was sacked on 24 February 2014. Böhme's first match in charge was a 1–0 win against 1. FC Kaiserslautern on 28 February 2014. Böhme was sacked following the relegation of the club. He was replaced by René Rydlewicz for the final match of the season and permanently replaced by Stefan Krämer. He finished with a record of three wins, two draws, and six losses.

Managerial statistics

Honours
Schalke 04
DFB-Pokal: 2000–01, 2001–02
UEFA Intertoto Cup: 2004

References

External links
 
 
 

1974 births
Living people
People from Burgenlandkreis
Footballers from Saxony-Anhalt
German footballers
Germany international footballers
FC Carl Zeiss Jena players
TSV 1860 Munich players
Arminia Bielefeld players
1. FC Nürnberg players
Eintracht Frankfurt players
FC Schalke 04 players
Borussia Mönchengladbach players
2002 FIFA World Cup players
Bundesliga players
2. Bundesliga players
2. Bundesliga managers
FC Energie Cottbus managers
Association football midfielders
German football managers
East German footballers
People from Bezirk Halle